Bless the Broken Road: The Duets Album is an album from contemporary Christian group Selah. It features the collaboration of other artists of the genre in each song. The album was released on August 8, 2006.

Track listing

Awards 

At the 38th GMA Dove Awards, the album won a Dove Awards for Inspirational Album of the Year. The title song was also nominated for Pop/Contemporary Recorded Song of the Year and Song of the Year, while the song "Glory" (featuring Nichole Nordeman) was nominated for Inspirational Recorded Song of the Year.

Chart performance 

The album peaked at No. 43 on the Billboard 200 and No. 1 on Billboards Christian Albums where it remained for 39 weeks. The title song also peaked at No. 5 on Billboards Christian Songs.

References 

2006 albums
Curb Records albums
Selah (band) albums